Repatriation of Armenians refers to the act of returning of ethnic Armenians to Armenia.

Background

Origins of the Armenian people 

Armenians are an ethnic group who originate from the eponymous Armenian Highlands, located in Western Asia, between Anatolia, the Caucasus, the Iranian Plateau, and the Fertile Crescent. Most of the region is currently divided between Armenia, Azerbaijan, Georgia, Iran, and Turkey.

Urartu, the predecessor of the Satrapy of Armenia, united the tribes of the highlands sometime in the 9th century BC, which eventually led to the emergence of the Armenian people. As the Armenian language spread, the highlands became homogenized.

The Armenian kingdoms that followed enjoyed sovereignty over the Armenian Highlands, but also often fell to the rule of foreign empires. However, when under foreign rule, Armenia often remained a self-ruling geopolitical entity, as a tributary or vassal state, and rarely under direct control of the ruling empire of the time. This allowed a distinguishable Armenian culture to develop and flourish, leading to the creation of its own unique alphabet and its own branch of Christianity.

Foreign rule 

It was in the 11th century, with the arrival of the Seljuk Turks, followed by waves of Turko-Mongol invasions around the time of the Mongol Empire, when Armenian self-rule in Armenia began to dramatically decline. By the time of the Timurid Empire in the 14th century, only pockets of Armenian autonomy remained, such as in Artsakh.

After centuries of instability, the political landscape in the Armenian Highlands finally settled, divided between the Ottoman Empire ruling the western portion, and Iran ruling the eastern portion. The two empires' rivalry was often settled with battles in the heart of the Armenian Highlands.

Displacements and deportations 

Armenians were persecuted, forcefully displaced, and deported multiple times in their history during foreign rule. In 578 AD, the Byzantine Emperor Maurice deported some 30,000 Armenians from territories under his control. He told his Persian counterpart to do the same.

Muslim rule in Armenia in the following centuries also accelerated the gradual emigration of Armenians. Several centuries later, conflicts between the Ottomans and Iranians caused the voluntary and forceful emigration of Armenians from the Armenian Highlands. One of the first major forced displacements of Armenians in the modern era was at the turn of 17th century when the Iranian king Abbas I moved Armenians from Iranian Armenia to the inner regions of his empire. The Ottomans were regularly making incursions into Abbas I's realm through Armenia, one of the Safavid Iran's primary frontiers. In order to remove the means of maintaining large armies on his frontiers, Abbas I adopted a scorched earth strategy and depopulated them as much as he could. He also used this as a way to enrich his realm by moving Armenians into Isfahan, the capital, as Armenians were esteemed merchants. Roughly 300,000 Armenians were moved from Chokhur-e Sa'd (roughly modern-day Yerevan and its surroundings), Beyazit, Van, and Nakhichevan, to Iranian Azerbaijan and Isfahan.

Until the beginning of the 20th century, Armenians continued to form the largest ethnic group (but not religious majority) in most of Ottoman Armenia. The demographics of the region changed considerably due to the Ottoman Empire's policy of settling Muslim refugees from the Balkans during the Balkan wars into the region, and the emigration of Ottoman Armenians to Russian Armenia, the latter of which had been ongoing since the mid-19th century, when most of Iranian Armenia had been annexed by the Russian Empire.

After the Armenian genocide during World War I, the Armenian population of Ottoman Armenia ceased to exist, being reduced to negligible numbers. Many who remained hid their identities or were assimilated. The survivors who did not remain formed the Armenian Diaspora, a community of Armenians who have spread around the world.

Contemporary situation 
The attachment of the Armenian people to their homeland was preserved within the Diaspora, through the establishment of Armenian communities and Armenian schools where their history was taught. Repatriation to Armenia became one of the goals of the Diaspora, but the incorporation of Armenia within the Soviet Union in 1920, the political and economic instability following Armenia's independence in 1991, its ongoing territorial conflict with neighboring Azerbaijan since 1988, and its location between two hostile countries (Turkey and Azerbaijan), have all been reasons for the disinclination of generations of Armenians in the Diaspora to leave the comfort of their host countries for Armenia, leading to assimilation and loss of interest in their ethnic origins among the younger generations (a circumstance sometimes called White Genocide among Armenians).

Russian Armenia (1828–1917)

Background 

In the 16th century, the Ottoman Empire had conquered Transcaucasia from Iran, which reconquered it in the early 17th century. The local Armenians, who had been laid destitute by heavy Ottoman taxation, and the Shi'ite Muslims who had been persecuted for their beliefs, welcomed Iran as liberators. In 1603, news of an Ottoman counteroffensive reached the king of Iran, Abbas II, who ordered the displacement of the population of Armenians from the province of Erivan (roughly modern-day Yerevan and its surrounding provinces, Igdir, Nakhchivan, and Maku), particularly from the town of Julfa, and also from the province Van, as part of a scorched earth strategy. It is estimated that the number of Armenians who were displaced by 1605 was as high as 300,000. Over the following centuries, several nomadic Turkic and Kurdish tribes settled in the area and established khanates.

In the 19th century, Russia acquired all of Transcaucasia, including most of Eastern Armenia, as a result of wars with Iran (1804–1813 and 1826–1828) and with the Ottoman Empire (1828–1829 and 1877–1878).

Armenian Oblast (1828–1840) 

After the Russian Empire annexed Transcaucasia from Iran, they established the Armenian Oblast out of the Erivan Khanate. In 1826, the population of the khanate was 110,120, of which 20,073 (~18.22%) was Armenian. The Russian Empire, along with the existing Armenian community in Transcaucasia, promoted the resettlement of Armenians fleeing from the Ottoman Empire in to the new oblast. As many as 40,000 from Qajar Iran and 100,000 from Ottoman Turkey left for the Russian-controlled territory.

Armenian refugees from the Ottoman Empire 

The Russo-Iranian and Russo-Ottoman wars caused a sentiment of distrust for Christians within the Muslim empires, particularly in the Ottoman Empire, which was amplified by their ongoing losses to Christian nations in the Balkans during the decline of the empire. Armenians were often accused of betrayal, leading irregulars opposing the Russian Empire to pillage and attack Armenians, and massacres such as the Hamidian Massacres.

Although a number of Armenians preferred Ottoman or Iranian rule, Armenians from within Russia did instigate revolts and feelings of national awakening among Ottoman Armenians. Many moved to Transcaucasia to join the revolutionary organizations that aimed to restore Armenian independence for Ottoman Armenia. This ultimately became one of the factors that led the Ottoman leadership to commit genocide and eliminate all Armenian presence from Ottoman Armenia. The influx of Armenian refugees into Transcaucasia was accelerated drastically as the Armenian genocide was being carried out starting from 1915.

First Republic of Armenia (1918–1920) 

After the fall of the Russian Empire in 1917, the Armenian population of Transcaucasia declared the independence of the first Armenian Republic in 1918. The short-lived republic dealt with war from all sides throughout the entirety of its existence. As the Ottoman Empire fell, the partition of the Ottoman Empire was being discussed at the Paris Peace Conference of 1919. The conference agreed that the Ottoman Empire had to surrender all of its territorial claims in Transcaucasia, but the parts of Ottoman Armenia to be awarded to the Armenian Republic was less clear, since its Armenian population had been extinguished during the Armenian genocide. Additionally, Armenians faced Muslim uprisings in the region (i.e., the Kars Republic). Finally, in the Treaty of Sèvres, a large part of Ottoman Armenia was awarded to the Armenian Republic, today referred to as Wilsonian Armenia, which the Ottoman government signed, but was never ratified.

While some Armenians attempted to repatriate Western Armenia, the Republic of Armenia was unable to put the legally acquired lands under its control due to its conflicts with neighbouring Georgia and Azerbaijan. Additionally, the new Turkish nationalist government formed in Ankara by Kemal Atatürk rejected the Treaty of Sèvres, and by the end of the summer of 1920, Turkish nationalists occupied the territories awarded to Armenia, and the Muslim population of the territories were ready to take up arms against enforcing the provisions of the Treaty of Sèvres, as they believed Ottoman Armenia to be their land.

Ultimately, as the Republic of Armenia was incorporated into the Soviet Union, Western Armenia was incorporated into Turkey by the signing of the Treaty of Lausanne, which confounded the hope of the Armenian refugees who aspired to repatriation. The treaty also changed the status of Armenian survivors who had found refuge in former Ottoman territories such as Syria and Lebanon; among the provisions of the Treaty of Lausanne was the requirement that refugees from Anatolia now living in former Ottoman territories be entitled to citizenship. For the authorities of the French Mandate for Syria and the Lebanon, this clause was providential. In 1924, Lebanese Armenians were naturalized en masse, and Armenians have never been able to repatriate Western Armenia since.

Armenian Soviet Socialist Republic (1920–1991) 

Following the Armenian genocide, a vast number of Armenians had fled to countries near the Ottoman Empire, such as Syria, Egypt and Lebanon, and formed large Armenian communities. With the ceding of the Syrian territory of Alexandretta by France to Turkey in 1939, a second wave of migrations of Armenians to the Levant took place.

From 1920–1929, some 28,000 Armenian refugees were invited by the Soviet government to settle in Armenia, hailing predominantly from Greece, Iraq and Istanbul, Turkey, as well as some from France and the United States. Edmund Herzig and Marina Kurkchiyan describe the dilemma of the League of Nations on the subject of the Armenian refugees:The Norwegian explorer and humanitarian Fridtjof Nansen, as League of Nations’ High Commissioner for Refugees, worked assiduously to convince the League to finance the repatriation of Armenians to Soviet Armenia. ‘There is, in fact,’he argued, ‘in this little republic a national home for the Armenians at last, and I ask the members of the Assembly whether they sincerely and earnestly believe that any other national home can be hoped for. I believe I know the answer which their consciences will give, and I appeal to the Assembly to approve this one effort to carry out all the promises which have been made in the past concerning a national home for the Armenian nation’. Ultimately the loan was not given, but from 1929 to 1937 16,000 more refugees arrived in Armenia, mostly from Europe and financed by the Soviet government.In the 1940s, the Armenian Soviet Socialist Republic organized an international repatriation campaign. A sizeable number of Armenians from the Diaspora repatriated the years following World War II.

Soviet territorial claims against Turkey 

From 1945 to 1953, the Soviet Union considered several different proposals for expanding their borders into Eastern Turkey. Part of these proposals included the acquisition of historical Western Armenian territories and the repatriation of Armenians from the Armenian diaspora. The territorial claims were renounced after Joseph Stalin passed away.

Egypt 

Armenians who settled in Egypt lived in prosperity. Following World War II, only a few thousand persons answered the call for repatriation to Soviet Armenia.

Lebanon 

Between 1946 and 1949, Lebanese President Bechara El Khoury’s administration provided assistance to Lebanese and Syrian Armenians who wished to repatriate to Soviet Armenia. However, Armenians felt more comfortable in Lebanon, and many of those who left Lebanon for Soviet Armenia in the 1940s under the Soviet Union's Armenian repatriation campaign returned to live in Lebanon, as Lebanon was considered a "second Armenia".

Republic of Armenia (1991–present) 

One of the main challenges of the Republic of Armenia is preserving its population numbers. Despite the recent rise in repatriation, the number of Armenians leaving Armenia is consistently higher.

Acquisition of an Armenian citizenship 

The Republic of Armenia has made an effort to simplify the acquisition of Armenian citizenship for ethnic Armenians living abroad, by including the right of return for members of the Armenian diaspora, and since 2007 permitting dual citizenship. Diaspora Armenians who want to live and work in Armenia, but want to be exempt from military service can also apply for a special residency status, which gives them a special passport and the same rights as citizens except the right to vote or access to the same countries that an Armenia passport would. Survivors of the Armenian genocide are granted special passports through a facilitated procedure, and the application fee is waived.

Syrian Civil War (2011–present) 

Since the start of the Syrian Civil War, 16,623 Armenian Syrians found refuge in Armenia, of which 13,000 remained and repatriated (as of July 2015). The government of Armenia is offering several protection options including simplified naturalization by Armenian descent (15,000 persons acquired Armenian citizenship), accelerated asylum procedures and facilitated short, mid and long-term residence permits.

According to Hranush Hakobyan only 15,000 Armenians are left in Syria and the rest have been settled in Armenia or Artsakh, with another 8,000 having left for Lebanon, and others going to destinations including Europe, the United States and Canada. However, Armenian foundations in Syria estimate around 35,000 are left based on rough estimates.

Azerbaijan has raised concerns over settlement of Syrian Armenians in the disputed territory of the Republic of Artsakh.

The integration of Syrian-Armenians to the Armenian community proved to be reasonably successful. Though Armenia could not provide many economic advantages to the arriving refugees, the Syrian-Armenians quickly found success in the food, restaurant, café, Horeca, and Accommodation industries.
The arrival of the Syrian-Armenians caused many positive externalities, one of the most prominent being the increase in the quality of the service industry within Armenia. In order for local Armenian businesses to survive, they had to compete with the newly opened Syrian-Armenian businesses, which increased competition and, later on, quality.

Although many Syrian-Armenians found success in Armenia, many had to leave their ancestral homeland to North America and Europe for better job opportunities.

2018 Velvet Revolution 

The corruption of the government of the Republic of Armenia has been criticized for having been one of the primary reasons as to why Diaspora Armenians have been detached from the Republic of Armenia. However, the success of the 2018 Velvet Revolution, aiming to end the corruption, is being seen as a turning point in the history of Armenia, with hopes that these negative opinions of Armenia will change and produce a new wave of repatriates. Awareness for these changes was boosted by several famous Armenians in the Diaspora, such as Serj Tankian from the System of a Down band.

On 20 May 2018, the president of Armenia, Armen Sarkissian, addressed the younger generation of Armenians worldwide during the Armenia Tomorrow: Citizen Diplomacy at Work conference organized by the University of Southern California Institute of Armenian Studies, in the wake of the Velvet Revolution:

Diaspora and NGOs (1915–present) 

Armenian communities and schools around the world often organize trips to Armenia, to visit or to offer volunteer work in exchange for accommodation subsidies, to preserve the sentiment of attachment to their homeland in the younger generations.

The Armenian General Benevolent Union (AGBU), the biggest and most influential Armenian organization in the world, helps to preserve and promote Armenian identity and heritage through educational, cultural and humanitarian programs, annually serving some 500,000 Armenians in over 30 countries. Other Armenian community organizations, such as the Armenian Youth Federation (AYF), also help to preserve the Armenian identity within the Diaspora.

Another international non-profit organization called Birthright Armenia, founded in 2003 by Edele Hovnanian, provides services to help Diaspora Armenians develop personal ties and a renewed sense of Armenian identity. Birthright Armenia is a volunteer internship enhancement program that also offers travel fellowships to eligible participants to assist in the development of Armenia. To participate, applicants are required to be of Armenian descent and be within a certain age range.

The non-profit NGO Repat Armenia, established in August 2012, provides services to assist Diaspora Armenians with their repatriation process. Their mission is to encourage the repatriation of professional and entrepreneurial individuals and families to Armenia to help in the development of the Armenian nation. They also influence government policies, and help to develop a pro-repatriation environment in Armenia.

All of these organizations have made efforts to reconnect the Diaspora Armenians with their homeland, in hopes that they will one day repatriate.

See also 
 Armenian diaspora
 Demographics of Armenia
 Ottoman Armenian population § Arnold J. Toynbee (1916)

References

External links 
 Birthright Armenia, a non-governmental, non-profit organization that allows Diaspora Armenians to experience daily life in Armenia.
 Repat Armenia, a non-governmental, non-profit institution promoting Armenian repatriation with staff based in Yerevan and a network of supporters worldwide.

Social history of Armenia
Republic of Artsakh
Armenia
Armenia
Armenia
Armenian diaspora
Armenia